Lackawanna County District Attorney v. Coss, 532 U.S. 394 (2001), was a United States Supreme Court case. The case concerned a federal prisoner who sought to challenge his current sentence by arguing it was enhanced based on an unconstitutional prior conviction. A divided Court held that such challenges could not be brought. The decision was based on a reading of the statute in question, not a Sixth Amendment constitutional analysis.

Background
Edward R. Coss, Jr., had an extensive criminal record. By the age of 16 he had been "adjudged a juvenile delinquent on five separate occasions". In October 1986, Coss was convicted in Pennsylvania state court of assault, vandalism, and criminal mischief. He was sentenced to two consecutive prison terms of six months to one year. A habeas challenge, based on a claim that his trial attorney was constitutionally ineffective, was never ruled on by state courts.

After serving these sentences, he was convicted of aggravated assault in 1990. The court enhanced his sentence based on the prior conviction. A new habeas action against this trial was based on an argument that the enhancement relied on an unconstitutional prior conviction. Both the federal district court and the Third Circuit Court of Appeals determined that the enhancement was not permissible. The state prosecutors petitioned the United States Supreme Court to hear an appeal through a writ of certiorari.

Opinion of the Court
Justice Sandra Day O'Connor wrote the majority opinion of the Court which reversed the decision of the Third Circuit. As the basis for the habeas challenge was Title 28, Section §2254 of the United States Code, each element of that section had to be fulfilled in order to gain relief (a reduction in sentence). The first element was that the petitioner is "in custody pursuant to the judgment of a state court", a status that Coss could not fulfill as he was not serving his 1986 sentences any longer. Additionally, the claim was not properly raised because the original sentence was "no longer open to attack".

Other parts of the majority opinion regarding  Sixth Amendment claims did not control a majority of the Court, thus the judgment of the Third Circuit was simply reversed.

Dissenting opinions

Souter's dissent
Justice Souter wrote a dissent which was joined by Justices Ginsburg and Stevens. Souter argued that because there was never a decision on the constitutionality of the original trial, the issue of "adverse effect" could still be raised.

Breyer's dissent
Another dissenting opinion in the case was authored by Justice Stephen Breyer. His short, one-paragraph opinion, argued that because the state has "failed to argue that the ... consideration of the 1986 convictions were harmless" there was no reason to overturn the Third Circuit's findings. This was a different reason than the Souter dissent, which is why he did not join it.

See also
 Habeas corpus
 Daniels v. United States (2001)

Notes

References

External links

United States Supreme Court cases
2001 in United States case law
United States habeas corpus case law
Lackawanna County, Pennsylvania
United States Supreme Court cases of the Rehnquist Court
2001 in Pennsylvania